"Be Mine!" is a song by Swedish recording artist Robyn, written and composed by herself and producer Klas Åhlund for her self-titled fourth studio album (2005). It was released as the album's lead single in Scandinavia in 2005 and released as the fourth single from the album across most European territories in 2008.

The track reached number three on the Swedish Singles Chart, and scored some success in the rest of Scandinavia, peaking within the top twenty in Finland, Norway and the United Kingdom. Released to great critical success, the song was ranked number twenty-one on Pitchfork Media's list of Top 50 Singles of 2005 and number fourth on a same-titled list by Stylus Magazine. Remixes of "Be Mine!" were produced by Dusty Kid, Jori Hulkkonen, Meat Boys, Ocelot, Redroche and Roger Sanchez, with a studio live version being featured on Robyn's The Rakamonie EP. The song is performed with piano accompaniment in live acoustic versions by Robyn.

The song's chorus was sampled for Rye Rye's 2011 song "Never Will Be Mine", which also features Robyn.

Music videos
Two music videos were produced for the song. The original video of "Be Mine!", directed by Brad Kluck and released in 2005, shows several Robyns (one bald, one a green-haired stripper, one with a bowl-cut and another dishevelled-looking one with white hair) featured in different scenes. Most of the different Robyns self-evaluate their appearance in some way, by looking into mirrors.

A second music video, directed by Max Vitali, was filmed for the 2007 release. It switches between shots of Robyn in a white room and Robyn going to a bar with a friend at night. Fitting with the song's lyrics, Robyn sees her object of infatuation at the bar, who she envisions to be holding her (however, is kissing his girlfriend). The new video for "Be Mine!" was first released on 27 November 2007 and is shown exclusively at Robyn's official website.

Track listings
Swedish CD single
(KOR001; Released )
"Be Mine!" – 3:26
"Be Mine!" (at Högalid Studio) – 4:10
"Jack U Off" – 2:14

UK CD single and iTunes EP
(1759899; Released  [physical] /  [digital])
"Be Mine!" – 3:26
"Be Mine!" (Ballad Version) – 4:10
"Eclipse" – 3:30
"Be Mine!" (Roger Sanchez Remix) – 7:59

UK iTunes single
(Released )
"Be Mine!" (Soul Seekerz Club Mix) – 7:38
"Be Mine!" (Soul Seekerz Radio Edit) – 3:18

UK iTunes remix EP
(Released )
"Be Mine!" (Roger Sanchez Mix) – 8:00
"Be Mine!" (Redroche Vocal Mix) – 6:59
"Be Mine!" (Ocelot Mthrfckrs Remix) – 6:20
"Be Mine!" (Wasted Youth Mix) – 4:31
"Be Mine!" (Dusty Kid In the Tunnels Mix) – 7:19
"Be Mine!" (Meat Boys Remix) – 4:59
"Be Mine!" (Jori Hulkkonen Vocal) – 9:03

GSA enhanced maxi-single
(0191336MIN; Released )
"Be Mine!" (Original) – 3:26
"Be Mine!" (Plastik Funk Remix) – 6:21
"Be Mine!" (Wasted Youth Mix) – 4:34
"Be Mine!" (Jori Hulkkonen Vocal Mix) – 9:06
"Be Mine!" (Ballad Version) – 4:10
"Be Mine!" (Video)

Mark E Remix single
"Be Mine!" (Mark E Remix) - 6:00

Personnel
Personnel are adapted from the Robyn liner notes.
 Robyn – lead vocals
 Mattias Helldén – cello
 Joakim Milder, Klas Åhlund – string arrangements
 Michael Ilbert – mixing
 Björn Engelmann – mastering

Charts

Weekly charts

Year-end charts

References

External links
 Robyn.com — official site

2000s ballads
2005 singles
2008 singles
Ministry of Sound singles
Robyn songs
Songs written by Klas Åhlund
Songs written by Robyn
Synth-pop ballads